Lucile Saint-Simon (born 19 October 1932) is a French actress from the Paris suburb of Corbeil-Essonnes. She appeared in such feature films as Les Bonnes Femmes (1960), The Hands of Orlac (1962), La donnaccia (Italian, 1965). In 2011, the LA Times called her a "forgotten actress".

Filmography

References

External links
 
 Photo: "Philippe Noiret, Sylva Koscina and Lucile Saint-Simon turning a 'Charming' scene of Robert Lamoureux's film"

1932 births
Living people
French film actresses
People from Corbeil-Essonnes
20th-century French actresses